Mensah may refer to:

 Mensah (surname), a Ghanaian surname

See also

 Asante-Mensah
 Azumah-Mensah
 Mensa (disambiguation)
 Mensah-Bonsu
 Mensah-Coker
 Nunoo-Mensah
 Tachie-Mensah
 Takyi-Mensah